2. liga, currently named DOXXbet liga due to sponsorship reasons, is the second-highest division in the Slovak football league system after the Fortuna Liga. The 2015–16 season of the DOXXbet liga will be the 23rd season of the second-tier football league in Slovakia, since its establishment in 1993.

For the second time in history, twenty-four teams will compete in two groups, with top six sides from each of groups will advance to a further round.

Changes from last season

Team changes
MFK Zemplín Michalovce and MFK Skalica  were promoted to the Slovak First Football League after the 2014–15 season.
MFK Košice and FK Dukla Banská Bystrica were relegated from the Slovak First Football League after the 2014–15 season.
OFK Dunajská Lužná, TJ Iskra Borčice, OFK Teplička nad Váhom, FK Spišská Nová Ves and FK Haniska were promoted from the Slovak Third Football League after the 2014–15 season.

Teams (Western Group)

Stadia and locations

Personnel and kits

League table

Teams (Eastern Group)

Stadium and locations

Personnel and kits

League table

Play-offs

Championship round

League table

Relegation round

League table (West)

League table (East)

Season statistics

Top goalscorers
Updated through matches played on 10 June 2016.

Hat-tricks

See also
2015–16 Slovak First Football League
2015–16 3. Liga (Slovakia)

Stats 
 List of transfers summer 2015
 List of transfers winter 2015–16

References

2015-16
2015–16 in European second tier association football leagues
2